Mirabulbus is a genus of mites in the family Pachylaelapidae. There are about five described species in Mirabulbus.

Species
These five species belong to the genus Mirabulbus:
 Mirabulbus lushanensis Ma, 2003
 Mirabulbus punctatus (Ishikawa, 1987)
 Mirabulbus qinbaensis Liu & Ma, 2001
 Mirabulbus scleoides (Ishikawa, 1969)
 Mirabulbus yadongensis (Ma & Wang, 1997)

References

Mesostigmata
Articles created by Qbugbot